The New Folk Implosion is the fourth and final studio album by the Folk Implosion. It was released on iMusic in 2003. In Europe, it was released on Domino Recording Company. The album was the group's first release without co-founder John Davis.

Critical reception

At Metacritic, which assigns a weighted average score out of 100 to reviews from mainstream critics, the album received an average score of 57, based on 11 reviews, indicating "mixed or average reviews".

Exclaim! wrote that the album "features Barlow in fine voice and exploring the catchy guitar rock that's marked his career." Now wrote that "the grittier, guitar-heavy sound stands in contrast to "Natural One"'s slick hiphop slinkiness and One Part Lullaby’s multi-layered marriage of indie rock and electronica."

Track listing

Personnel
Credits adapted from liner notes.

The Folk Implosion
 Lou Barlow – vocals, bass guitar, loop (2, 7), production, recording (2, 7), mixing (1–3, 5, 6, 9)
 Imaad Wasif – guitar, sitar (6), production, mixing (1–3, 5, 6, 9)
 Russell Pollard – drums, bass guitar (3, 9), vocals (9), production, mixing (1–3, 5, 6, 9)

Additional personnel
 Aaron Espinoza – piano (3, 5), recording (1, 3, 5, 6, 9), mixing (1, 3, 5, 6, 9)
 Wally Gagel – production (2, 7), recording (2, 7), mixing (2, 7)
 Mickey Petralia – production (4, 8), recording (4, 8), mixing (4, 8)
 Greg Kurstin – electric piano (4)
 David McConnell – mixing (1, 3, 9)
 Eddie Schreyer – mastering
 Carol Sheridan – photography

References

External links
 

2003 albums
The Folk Implosion albums
Domino Recording Company albums
Albums produced by Mickey Petralia